Giuseppe Arlacchi, also known as Pino (born 21 February 1951), is an Italian sociologist and is well known worldwide for his studies and essays about the Mafia. He represents the Democratic Party and is a member of the Socialists and Democrats (S&D) parliamentary group since 2010.

On 1 September 1997, he was appointed Director-General of the United Nations Office at Vienna and Executive Director of the United Nations Drug Control Programme (since merged into the United Nations Office on Drugs and Crime), with the rank of Under-Secretary-General. Currently, he is a full professor of sociology at the University of Sassari.

Biography 
He was born in Gioia Tauro, Calabria. In the early 1990s, he was involved in the foundation of the Direzione Investigativa Antimafia (DIA), a law-enforcement agency specially entrusted with fighting organized crime.

Later on he became president of IASOC (International Association for the Study of Organized Crime). Finally, he was appointed honorary president of the Giovanni Falcone foundation, named after noted magistrate Giovanni Falcone, who was also a close friend of his.

Academic career
He has been associate professor of applied sociology at the University of Calabria and at the University of Florence. Moreover, he was visiting professor at the Columbia University of New York City, USA. Later on, he got the full professor position at the University of Sassari, where he is currently professor of sociology in the political science faculty.

Political career
In 1994–1996 he was a member of the lower chamber of the Italian parliament and, between 1996–1997, of the Senate. During this period, he was appointed vice-president of the Antimafia Commission, a bicameral commission of the Italian Parliament to which he had already collaborated as consultant between 1984 and 1986.

From 2009 to 2014 he was a Member of the European Parliament for Southern Italy: initially with the Italy of Values (ALDE), then with the Democratic Party (S&D).

In 2010 he was rapporteur for the European Parliament report A new strategy for Afghanistan which flagged the risks related to very high levels of corruption in the management of international aid funds within the context of the war in Afghanistan to the increase of opium production.

United Nations activities 
As soon as he was appointed director of UNDCP he started a worldwide campaign against drugs, the so-called "A Drug Free World".

The key point of such proposal was the elimination of all opium and cocaine plantations by the end of 2008, by means of the development of alternative plantations. Such a proposal had been proposed by Arlacchi immediately after his installation at the UN office and it had been unanimously approved by the UN general assembly in June 1998.

After that time, the production of narcotic decreased, in particular in Afghanistan. The new war conducted by the US against the Taliban regime interrupted the program started by Arlacchi some years before. After the beginning of the war, the production of opium restarted.

A review of the Arlacchi plan has been carried out in March 2009 by the UN Commission on Narcotic Drugs. The Political Declaration approved at the end of the review process acknowledged significant progresses and reconfirmed the whole strategy for another 10 years, until 2019.

The most important result achieved by Arlacchi during his activity at the UN was the promotion of a UN convention against all the forms of organized criminality, that has been held in Palermo in 2000. The document of this convention came into effect in 2003.

Azerbaijan election controversy 

As Head of the European Parliament's monitoring team, Pino Arlacchi certified that the elections in Azerbaijan on 9 October 2013 were "free, fair and transparent". Observers from the OSCE / ODIHR, led by Italian politician Tana de Zulueta, spoke of restrictions on freedom of speech during elections.

Varying estimates of the elections led to a scandal. On October 11, the representative of the European Union, Catherine Ashton and European Commissioner Stefan Fule, ignored the assessment of the European Parliament, including in its statement the results of the ODIHR. The Commission on Foreign Relations of the EU discussed the report of Arlacchi. During the discussion, representatives of the "green" condemned the report and said that it discredited the European Parliament. It later emerged that a number of EU representatives traveled to Azerbaijan unofficially and on the dime of Azerbaijani organizations, which was regarded by European Voice as "stupidity or corruption", these trips were labeled "electoral tourism".

Arlacchi dismissed the criticism as uncivilized and fictitious and replied that his assessment of the Azerbaijani presidential elections was not personal but reflected that of sixty-five other parliamentarians belonging to three different delegations (OSCE, EP, Council of Europe), and of over one thousand observers from another 46 delegations present on site and from all over the world.

Bibliography 
Arlacchi is the author of several books and publications on the Mafia and transnational organized crime, which have been translated into many languages. He has received a number of national and international awards and decorations, in recognition of his outstanding contribution towards a better understanding of the Mafia.
His publications  include Mafia Business: The Mafia Ethic and the Spirit of Capitalism and  Mafia, Peasants and Great Estates: Society in Traditional Calabria.

References

External links 
 Pino Arlacchi Official Site
 MEP profile

1951 births
Living people
People from Gioia Tauro
Antimafia
Italian sociologists
Italian criminologists
Non-fiction writers about organized crime in Italy
Democratic Party (Italy) MEPs
Italy of Values MEPs
Democratic Party (Italy) politicians
Italy of Values politicians
Democratic Party of the Left politicians
MEPs for Italy 2009–2014
21st-century Italian politicians